Farouk Bouzo (born 3 March 1938 Damascus, Syria) is a retired Syrian international football referee.

Career 
Farouk Bouzo was a FIFA referee from 1969 until 1980. He officiated an international match in the 1978 FIFA World Cup group stages. He has the distinct honor of being the first Syrian referee to lead a match at a World Cup and the first referee to receive a 10 (highest recognition) grade from his inspector for his great performance in a World Cup match. He also officiated three matches at the 1977 FIFA World Youth Championship. He issued two yellow cards at the 1978 World Cup match between Germany and Mexico (6–0), one to each side.

After career 

He served as Secretary-General of the Syrian Football Association in 1976 and President from 1982 to 1994. After his retirement from refereeing, Bouzo became the National Referee Coordinator and Chairman of the AFC Referees Committee.

Successes 
In 1996, he was awarded the FIFA Order of Merit, the highest honor by FIFA.

References and notes

External links 

 Profile in DFB - dfb.de
 Profil - www.worldfootball.net
 Profil - worldreferee.com

1938 births
Living people
Syrian sportspeople
Sportspeople from Damascus
Syrian football referees
FIFA World Cup referees
1978 FIFA World Cup referees